Rongères is a commune in the Allier department in Auvergne in central France.

Population

Gallery

See also
 Communes of the Allier department

References

Communes of Allier
Allier communes articles needing translation from French Wikipedia